The Johanna  Lucretia is a British tall ship and is an oak wooden two masted topsail schooner built at the Rhoos Shipyard, Ghent in Belgium in 1945. The Johanna Lucretia measures 96 ft (28.65m) in length, her beam is 18 ft (5.50m), her draught is 8 ft (2.45m) and she has a total sail area of 380 m2.

Although originally built as a fishing vessel, the Johanna Lucretia was never used for that purpose and was converted for recreational use in 1954, by the then owner Ber van Meer. She sailed in Dutch waters until 1989 from her port in Enkhuizen in the Netherlands. In 1989 the Johanna Lucretia was sold and transferred her base to Plymouth in the United Kingdom under the ownership of Mrs. Heather Henning.

In 1991/1992 she was refitted in Gloucester at the Tommy Nielson Yard and was used for charter mainly from Gibraltar, the Caribbean and the Eastern coast of the United States until 2001, after which she was sold to Cutlass Classic Charters Ltd.

The Johanna Lucretia has starred in the film The Riddle of the Sands in 1978 when she took the part of the Medusa and more recently in the film Amazing Grace - a drama about William Wilberforce's campaign to end the slave trade. She also starred in the Irish reality TV show Cabin Fever where she replaced the original Cabin Fever ship after it ran aground off Tory Island.

The Johanna Lucretia was seized by British Waterways for non-payment of dues at Gloucester Docks and, although there was interest from a Johanna Lucretia Sailing Trust, she was purchased for private use and was to remain in Gloucester Docks during the winter months of 2008-09 while undergoing a re-fit. In September 2018 she was purchased by The Island Trust.

Johanna Lucretia was the 2012 Tall Ship Races Class B Overall winner on corrected time.

Gallery

References

Tall ships of the United Kingdom
Tall ships of Belgium
Individual sailing vessels
1945 ships